Chorodna is a genus of moths in the family Geometridae. One of its synonyms is Medasina.

Species
Chorodna adumbrata (Moore, 1887)
Chorodna celaenosticta (Prout, 1928)
Chorodna complicataria (Walker, 1860)
Chorodna creataria (Guenée, 1857)
Chorodna erebusaria  (Walker, 1860)
Chorodna metaphaeria (Walker, 1862)
Chorodna nigrovittata (Moore, 1868)
Chorodna ochreimacula (Prout, 1914)
Chorodna pallidularia  Moore, 1867
Chorodna praetextata (Felder, 1874) 
Chorodna pseudobolima Holloway, 1993
Chorodna quadrinota Warren, 1893
Chorodna scurobolima Holloway, 1993
Chorodna semiclusaria Walker, 1862
Chorodna strixaria (Guenée, 1857) (type species)
Chorodna testaceata  Moore,  1867
Chorodna ugandaria  (Swinhoe, 1904)
Chorodna vagans (Moore, 1888)
Chorodna vulpinaria  Moore,  1867

References

Gunathilagaraj Kandasamy (2016). Checklist of Indian Geometridae with FBI number.docx. - Tamil Nadu Agricultural University
 Chorodna at Markku Savela's Lepidoptera and Some Other Life Forms
 Natural History Museum Lepidoptera genus database

Boarmiini
Moth genera